The Scythian Suite, Op. 20 is an orchestral suite by Sergei Prokofiev written in 1915.

Background
Prokofiev originally wrote the music for the ballet Ala i Lolli, the story of which takes place among the Scythians. Commissioned by Sergei Diaghilev, the ballet was written to a scenario by Russian poet Sergey Gorodetsky. But when Diaghilev rejected the score even before its completion, the composer reworked the music into a suite for concert performance.

The suite was premiered on 16/29 January 1916 at the Mariinsky Theatre in St. Petersburg, conducted by the composer.

A scheduled Moscow performance of the suite that December was cancelled at the last minute due to the difficulty of finding musicians to play the piece; it called for an enlarged orchestra and, as many performers had been mobilized due to World War I, enough players could not be found. Nevertheless, the Moscow music critic Leonid Sabaneyev gave the music a scathing review. Prokofiev responded that the supposed performance must have been a product of Sabaneyev's imagination, as the only copy of the score was in the composer's hands and thus he had not even been able to see it.

Movements
The suite is in four movements and lasts around 20 minutes.

Instrumentation
The music is scored for a large orchestra:

Woodwinds
1 piccolo
3 flutes (3rd doubling alto flute)
3 oboes
1 English horn
3 clarinets (3rd doubling E clarinet)
1 bass clarinet
3 bassoons
1 contrabassoon

Brass
8 horns
4 (optionally 5) trumpets (3rd doubling E trumpet)
4 trombones
1 tuba

Percussion
Timpani

Glockenspiel
Xylophone
2 cymbals
Tamtam
Triangle
Bass drum
Snare drum
Tambourine

Celesta
Piano

Strings
Violins I, II
Violas
Cellos
Double basses
2 harps

Adaptations 
The Bermuda Triangle (1978) is an electronic adaptation by Isao Tomita that includes the first movement (The Adoration of Veles and Ala) of the Scythian Suite.

The track "The Enemy God Dances with the Black Spirits" on Works Volume 1 by progressive rock group Emerson, Lake & Palmer is an arrangement of the second movement.

The San Francisco Symphony Orchestra, conducted by Michael Tilson Thomas, performed the piece during Metallica's S&M2 concerts at Chase Center, San Francisco on September 6 and 8, 2019.

Notes

References
David Ewen. Encyclopedia of Concert Music.  New York: Hill and Wang, 1959.
Nicolas Slonimsky. Slonimsky's Book of Musical Anecdotes.  New York: Schirmer Books, 1998.
Sergei Prokofiev. Soviet Diary 1927 and Other Writings. London: Faber, 1991.
Sergei Prokofiev. Diaries 1915-1923: Behind the Mask, trans. Anthony Phillips. London: Faber, 2008.

External links
 

Suites by Sergei Prokofiev
1915 compositions